The Endless Shimmering is the fifth full-length studio album by And So I Watch You from Afar, released on 20 October 2017. The album's cover is a photograph taken by drummer Chris Wee's friend of his daughter with their dog.

Reception

The Endless Shimmering received positive reviews from critics. On Metacritic, the album holds a score of 77/100 based on 5 reviews, indicating "generally favorable reviews".

Track listing

References

2017 albums
And So I Watch You from Afar albums
Sargent House albums